Charles Henry Lambert (13 January 1894 – 12 July 1983) was an Anglican priest in the 20th century.

He was educated at Leeds University and Ripon College Cuddesdon and ordained in 1918. After curacies in Redcar and Guisborough he held incumbencies in York and  Royston. He was Warden of Whalley Abbey from  1934 to 1945; Archdeacon of Blackburn from 1946 to 1959, and then of Lancaster from that year  to 1966.

References

1894 births
1983 deaths
Alumni of the University of Leeds
Alumni of Ripon College Cuddesdon
Archdeacons of Blackburn
Archdeacons of Lancaster